There Goes My Heart may refer to:

 There Goes My Heart (film), 1938
 "There Goes My Heart" (The Mavericks song), 1994
 "There Goes My Heart" (Lisa Stansfield song), 2014
 There Goes My Heart Again, 1989, a song recorded by American country music artist Holly Dunn